Three vessels with the name Scarborough have served the British East India Company (EIC).

  was launched December 1734 and made two voyages for the EIC. The Royal Navy purchased her on 21 November 1739 to use as a storeship, but then used her as a hospital ship instead. The Navy sold her on 18 December 1744.
 , launched c.1740, made four voyages for the EIC and gave her name to Scarborough Shoal after grounding there in 1748.
 , launched in 1782, carried convicts on the First Fleet to New South Wales, carried a cargo for the EIC from China back to Britain, and again carried convicts on the Second Fleet. Scarborough then made one more trip for the EIC between 1801 and 1802. 

Ships of the British East India Company
Age of Sail merchant ships
Merchant ships of the United Kingdom